Captiva may refer to:

Captiva 240, an American sailboat design
Captiva, Florida, an unincorporated community on Captiva Island, Florida, United States
Captiva Island, an island in Florida, United States
Captiva Records, an American record label
Captiva Software, an American software company
Chevrolet Captiva, a compact crossover SUV marketed by General Motors
Holden Captiva, the Australian version of the first-generation Chevrolet Captiva
Captiva (album), an album by Christian rock band Falling Up
Captiva, an instant camera released by Polaroid during the mid-1990s